Project Runway All Stars is a spin-off of Project Runway, featuring returning designers competing for grand prizes. Angela Lindvall and Carolyn Murphy have each hosted one season before Alyssa Milano became the staple host of the past five seasons. As on Project Runway, the designers are judged by the host, two permanent judges and guest judges throughout the season. The permanent All Stars judges have been designers Georgina Chapman and Isaac Mizrahi. Joanna Coles mentored the designers throughout seasons one and two, Zanna Roberts Rassi replaced her in season three to five and Anne Fulenwider mentored season six and season seven.

In May, 2016, Lifetime renewed Project Runway All Stars for two more seasons (six and seven) in a deal with The Weinstein Company. Following the 2017 allegations against Harvey Weinstein, The Weinstein Company filed for bankruptcy, Project Runway was picked up by its original broadcaster Bravo, but no comment has been made about Project Runway All Stars.

Format
Same as Project Runway, All Stars follows the same format with challenges, judgings, and eliminations.

Judging

Judging duties on the first season of All Stars were taken up by host, Angela Lindvall, fashion designers Georgina Chapman, Isaac Mizrahi, and a fourth guest judge, usually a fashion designer, a supermodel, a celebrity, or a professional from an industry related to the challenge given. The second season saw the replacement of Lindvall as host and judge by supermodel Carolyn Murphy, who only remained with the show for one season also. American actress Alyssa Milano became the host and judge on All Stars in the third season, and has remained on the show for five seasons. Joanna Coles acts as a mentor to the designers, giving them suggestions and tips for their designs throughout the episode, but she does not participate in the judging's. Coles was the stable mentor for the first and second season, until Zanna Roberts Rassi replaced her in the third to fifth season. Anne Fulenwider took over for final two seasons.

Seasons

All Stars: Season 1

Lifetime's first season of Project Runway All Stars consisted of twelve one-hour episodes featuring 13 past contestants competing in a series of challenges. The airdate was set for November 3, 2011, but was pushed back to January 5, 2012. The season was hosted by Angela Lindvall  and the recurring judges were fashion designers Isaac Mizrahi and Georgina Chapman. The winner was Mondo Guerra.

All Stars: Season 2

The second season of All-Stars began airing October 25, 2012. Carolyn Murphy replaced Angela Lindvall as host, while Isaac Mizrahi and Georgina Chapman were back for Season 2 as judges. Season 2 also featuring 13 designers, and Anthony Ryan Auld was the winner.

All Stars: Season 3

It was announced in June 2013 that a third All Stars season was in the works with Alyssa Milano as the host. Isaac Mizrahi and Georgina Chapman were also returning as judges. Zanna Roberts Rassi, the senior fashion editor for Marie Claire, joined this season as the mentor. The season started production in late June 2013, and premiered on October 24, 2013. Mary Kay Cosmetics is the supplier for all makeup used by the designers for this season, and it is their first time to be featured on the series.. Seth Aaron Henderson was the winner among 11 participating designers.

All Stars: Season 4

Reports of a fourth season of All Stars, once again hosted by Milano, were confirmed on social media by Nicole "Snooki" Polizzi, who served as a guest judge. The cast of 14 designers was revealed on September 16, with a premiere date set for October 30, 2014. Dmitry Sholokhov was the winner.

All Stars: Season 5

The fifth season of All Stars premiered in the beginning of 2016. Alyssa Milano returned as host as well as Isaac Mizrahi, Georgina Chapman and Zanna Roberts Rassi. Season 5 features 13 designers, and Dom Streater was the winner.

All Stars: Season 6

The sixth season of All Stars premiered in January 2018. Alyssa Milano returned in her role as host, and Isaac Mizrahi and Georgina Chapman remain regular judges. Anne Fulenwider mentored the designers. Season 6 features eight new All Stars designers, and eight designers who have competed on All Stars previously. The winner of this season was Anthony Williams.

All Stars: Season 7

The seventh season of All Stars premiered in January 2019. Alyssa Milano returned in her role as host, and Isaac Mizrahi and Georgina Chapman remain regular judges. Anne Fulenwider mentored the designers. The season featured seven former U.S. winners and seven international winners. The winner was Michelle Lesniak.

Contestants

References

Project Runway All Stars
Lifetime (TV network) original programming
2012 American television series debuts
2010s American reality television series
Television series by Bunim/Murray Productions
Television series by The Weinstein Company